Hyacinthe Jadin (27 April 1776 – 27 September 1800) was a French composer who came from a musical family. His uncle Georges Jadin was a composer in Versailles and Paris, along with his father Jean Jadin, who had played bassoon for the French Royal Orchestra.  He was one of five musical brothers, the best known of whom was Louis-Emmanuel Jadin.

Life and career
Jadin was born in Versailles. At the age of 9, Jadin's first composition, a Rondo for piano, was published in the Journal de Clavecin.  By the age of thirteen, Jadin had premiered his first work with the Concert Spirituel.

Jadin took a job in 1792 as assistant rehearsal pianist (Rezizativbegleiter) at the Theatre Feydeau. In this year he composed the Marche du siège de Lille ("March of the Siege of Lille"), commemorating the successful resistance of the citizens of Lille when besieged by Austrian forces. 
 
In 1794, Jadin published an overture for 13 wind instruments entitled Hymn to 21 January.  The piece commemorated the one-year anniversary of the execution of Citizen Capet (the name given to Louis XVI during his trial for treason).  In 1795, he began teaching a female piano class at the Paris Conservatoire.

From 1795 until his death Jadin suffered from tuberculosis. At the time of his death, he was impoverished.

Works
While chamber music formed a large part of Jadin's creative career, he is most well known for his progressive style of piano composition.  Jadin's works anticipated the music of Franz Schubert; his piano sonatas in particular display a proto-Romanticism, which in parts both rejected and extended the heritage of his Classical predecessors.

Orchestra
 Piano Concerto No. 1 (1796–97)
 Allegro brillante
 Adagio
 Rondeau - Allegretto
 Piano Concerto No. 2 in D minor (1796), accompanied by 2 violins, viola, double bass, flutes, oboes, bassoons, and horns 
 Allegro moderato
 Adagio
 Rondo - Allegro
 Piano Concerto No. 3 in A (1798), accompanied by 2 violins, viola, double bass, 2 flutes, 2 bassoons, and 2 horns
 Allegro moderato
 Rondo - Allegro

Concert band
 Ouverture pour instruments à vent (c. 1795)

Wind band with chorus
 Hymne du vingt-un janvier (1794), based on text by Charles Le Brun
 Chanson pour la fête de l'agriculture (1796), based on text by Ange Etienne Xavier Poisson de Lachabeaussière
 Hymne du dix germinal, based on text by Théodore Désorgues

Stage
 Le testament mal-entendu (1793), comédie mêlée d'ariettes in 2 acts, libretto by François Guillaume Ducray-Duminil
 Cange ou Le commissionnaire de Lazare (1794), fait historique in 1 act, libretto by André-Pépin Bellement

Piano
 Rondo (1785)
 Piano (or Harpsichord) Sonata No. 1 in D (1794), accompanied by violin
 Allegro
 Andantino un poco allegretto
 Menuet: Allegro
 Final: Presto
 Piano (or Harpsichord) Sonata No. 2 in B-flat (1794), accompanied by violin
 Allegro fieramente
 Rondo: Allegretto non tropo
 Piano (or Harpsichord) Sonata No. 3 in F minor (1794), accompanied by violin
 Allegretto poco agitato
 Adagio
 Menuet: Allegro
 Rondo: Allegro non tropo
 Piano Sonatas, op. 3 nos. 1-3 (1795)
 Piano Sonata in B-flat, op. 4 no. 1 (1795)
 Allegro
 Andante
 Finale: Presto
 Piano Sonata in F-sharp minor, op. 4 no. 2 (1795)
 Allegro motto
 Menuet - Trio
 Finale: Allegro
 Piano Sonata in C-sharp minor, op. 4 no. 3 (1795)
 Allegro moderato
 Adagio
 Rondeau: Allegretto
 Piano Sonata in F minor, op. 5 no. 1 (1795)
 Allegro moderato
 Adagio
 Final: Allegro
 Piano Sonata in D, op. 5 no. 2 (1795)
 Allegro 
 Andante
 Final: Presto
 Piano Sonata in C minor, op. 5 no. 3 (1795)
 Allegro maestoso
 Andante
 Allegro
 Duo in F (1796), for four hands 
 Allegro brillante
 Andante
 Rondo: Allegro
 Piano Sonata in C minor, op. 6 no. 1 (1800)
 Allegro moderato
 Andante sostenuto
 Final: Allegro
 Piano Sonata in A, op. 6 no. 2 (1800)
 Andante
 Rondeau: Allegretto
 Piano Sonata in F, op. 6 no. 3 (1800)
 Allegro moderato
 Adagio
 Allegro assai

Chamber
 String Quartets for 2 violins, viola, and violoncello
B-flat, op. 1 no. 1 (1795)
 Largo - Allegro non troppo
 Adagio
 Menuet - Trio
 Finale - Allegro
A, op. 1 no. 2 (1795)
 Allegro
 Menuet - Trio
 Pastoral Andante
 Finale
F minor, op. 1 no. 3 (1795)
 Allegro moderato
 Menuet
 Adagio
 Polonaise
E-flat, op. 2 no. 1 (1796)
 Largo - allegro moderato 
 Adagio
 Menuetto
 Allegro Finale 
B minor, op. 2 no. 2 (1796)
 Allegro
 Menuetto
 Adagio non troppo
 Allegro Finale
C, op. 2 no. 3 (1796)
 Allegro
 Andante 
 Menuetto
 Presto Finale
C, op. 3 no. 1 (1797)
 Allegro moderato
 Adagio
 Menuette - Andante
 Presto Finale
E, op. 3 no. 2 (1797)
 Allegro moderato
 Menuet
 Adagio
 Allegro
A minor, op. 3 no. 3 (1797)
 Allegro moderato
 Adagio
 Menuet
 Finale
G, op. 4 no. 1 (1798)
 Allegro moderato
 Rondo Allegro
F, op. 4 no. 2 (1798)
 Allegro non troppo
 Minuetto Trio
 Adagio molto
 Allegro assai
D, op. 4 no. 3 (1798)
 Largo - Allegro moderato
 Minuetto
 Andante
 Finale Allegro
 String Trios books 1 & 2 for violin, viola, and violoncello.
Opus 2, 1797 dedicated 'a son ami (Rodolphe?) Kreutzer' for 'Violon, Alto et Basse':  
E flat major, op. 2 no. 1 
 Allegro moderato
 Menuet
 Siciliane
 Finale: Allegro
G major, op. 2 no. 2 
 Allegro
 Menuet
 Finale: Allegro
F major, op. 2 no. 3 
 Allegro
 Menuet: Andante/ Trio: Allegro
 Adagio
 Rondeau: Allegro
 IMSLP also lists a set of three string trios, Opus 1a -First Published 1790, dedicated to 'Son ami Montbeillard' for the combination of 2 violins & bass.

Vocal
 Marche du siège de Lille (1792) for voice and piano (or harp)
 Romance à la lune (1796) for voice and piano (or harp)
 Le tombeau de Sophie (1796) for voice and harpsichord (or harp)

Notes

References
 
 Castinel, N. Aube d'une vie musicale sous la révolution: la vie et l'oeuvre de Hyacinthe Jadin 1776-1800.  Lyon, 1991.
 Richard Fuller, “Hyacinthe Jadin (1776-1800)”, Composers’ short biographies, https://web.archive.org/web/20070222061440/http://members.klosterneuburg.net/handerle/COMPOSER.HTM#JADIN

External links
 

1776 births
1800 deaths
French male classical composers
French Classical-period composers
Composers for piano
18th-century French male classical pianists
French conductors (music)
French male conductors (music)
French music educators
19th-century deaths from tuberculosis
Tuberculosis deaths in France
People from Versailles
18th-century classical composers
18th-century conductors (music)
18th-century keyboardists
String quartet composers
18th-century French composers